Don Sallee (March 17, 1933–August 27, 2019) is an American former politician and attorney from Kansas who served as a member of both the Kansas House of Representatives and the Kansas Senate.

Sallee was born in Troy, Kansas. He served in the U.S. Army during the Korean War, after which he returned to Kansas, where he farmed and worked as an electrician.

In 1982, Sallee was elected to the Kansas House of Representatives, where he served 3 terms from 1983 to 1988. He was then elected to the Kansas State Senate in 1988 and re-elected in 1992 and 1996; in 1997, he resigned his seat to serve as a magistrate judge for Doniphan County. He retired from his judgeship in 1999 and founded a computer sales and service company. Sallee died at his home in 2019.

References

Republican Party Kansas state senators
Republican Party members of the Kansas House of Representatives
People from Troy, Kansas
20th-century American politicians
Kansas state court judges
United States Army personnel of the Korean War
1933 births
2019 deaths